If They Tell You I Fell is a 1989 Spanish film written and directed by Vicente Aranda, starring Victoria Abril and Jorge Sanz along with Antonio Banderas and Javier Gurruchaga. It is an adaptation of the novel of the same title by Juan Marsé, which was based on the killing of Carmen Broto. Set mostly in the old quarter of 1940s Barcelona, the film centers in a young rag and bone merchant who falls in love with a prostitute. If They Tell You I Fell has an intricate narrative in which real and imagined stories blend in a crosswords style.

Plot
In the post Spanish Civil War years, Catalan kids would sit in circles among the ruins and tell stories, known as "aventis" open-ended narratives drifting back and forth through time. Laced with horror and perversity, these tales mix war stories, local gossip, comic book characters, fantasy and real events. The "aventis" of this film are told in flashback in 1970, 1940, 1936 and the mid-1980s.

In 1970, Nito, a medical examiner assistant and sister Paulina, a nurse-nun (who grew up together, and now are co-workers in a hospital) identify the corpse of a couple who had drowned during a car accident. The dead man is Daniel Javaloyes "Java", one of the main characters of the "aventis" of their childhood and adolescence. The woman seems to be Juanita, who forty years before was one of many orphans. The discovery of Java's body (long presumed dead) leads them to remember what had happened decades before. Flashbacks reveal a story that may or may not have happened.

In the old quarter of 1940s Barcelona inhabitants are struggling to survive among the ruins left by the Spanish Civil War. Daniel Javaloyes, "Java" is one of them.  He is a young man trying by any means to leave behind the misery around him. He lives in a dilapidated house with his grandmother, a mute trapper. To make some money, the hardened Java performs perverse sexual acts for the voyeuristic pleasure of Don Conrado, a rich sadistic man, who uses a wheelchair after being wounded during the war. In one of those sexual encounters for hire, Java has violent sex with Ramona, a visibly pregnant prostitute. From then on Java is smitten with the fallen woman. Initially he finds out very little about her, but when Conrado's mother visits him also looking for her, Java learns that Ramona had been a maid in Don Conrado's household. She bears a scarred left nipple caused by his sadism.

Marcos, Java's older brother, was an anarchist during the war and now is hiding on the grounds of the family's house. He yearns to see his girlfriend, Aurora Nin, again, whose identity would be blended with Ramona's in the stories told by Sarnita, one of the kids in Java's neighborhood. Sarnita entertains his friends telling them aventis, mixing real events with others that have been invented. Aurora Nin and Java are prominent figures in those stories. Meanwhile, the perverse Don Conrado is directing a religious amateur play about the sacrifice of a Christian martyr. Fueguiña, one of the orphans in the institution where Paulina works, plays the leading role. Java wants to be an actor and blackmails Fueguiña in order to take the part of the devil in the play. Reluctantly Conrado allows him to participate, at least during rehearsals.

Flash back to 1936. During the war, Marcos, fighting for the Republic, takes revenge on Don Conrado's brutality towards his girlfriend Aurora Nin. When the men under Marco's command do not find Conrado, they kill Conrado's father instead. Conrado's mother barely escapes with her life thanks to Aurora's intervention.

In one of his sexual assignments for Conrado, Java has a young man as a sexual partner instead of a woman. He does not back down, but knowing that Ado, the teenager, has been paid twice as much, he follows him to get a bigger share of the money. Through Ado, Java gets involved with a rich jewelry dealer. In him, Java sees the opportunity to escape his poverty-restricted life.

In 1940, Marcos’ old cronies from the war are also looking for him. Still trying secret anti-government plots, they have resorted mainly to criminal activities. Palau, the leader of the gang has chosen his target: Menchu, a bleach blonde prostitute who works for the elite Falangist of the city. To strike them back, Palau and his partners Fusam and Sendra attack Menchu, brutally killing her. When his pursuit of Ramona proves aimless, Java, now sure that Ramona is in fact Aurora Nin, leads Ramona to Marcos's secret hiding place and the former lovers are happily reunited. Taking advantage of a commotion in the neighborhood Marcos and Ramona managed to escape the city.

In modern-day Barcelona, by the mid-1980s, Palau, on a busy street, has a glance of an old couple asking for money. They seem to be Marcos and Aurora Nin.

Cast
If They Tell You I Fell has a large cast headed by Jorge Sanz and Victoria Abril. It was their first of three collaborations under Vicente Aranda's direction. Victoria Abril, Aranda's favorite actress, plays three different roles in the film. She was six months pregnant when she shot the explicit sexual scenes in the film. Antonio Banderas has a small role. Two of the young actors: Juan Diego Botto and María Botto (they are siblings) became very popular in the Spanish screens in the following years.

Production
The film is an Ideas y Producciones Cinematográficas production. Producer Enrique Viciano suggested a film adaptation of a novel by Catalan author Juan Marsé to director Vicente Aranda, who had previously adapted Marsé's novel The Girl with the Golden Panties, making it into an art house hit. Aranda was given the choice between Marsé's novels: Ronda de Guinardó and If They Tell You I Fell. He chose the second one. In fact years before Aranda had wanted to make that novel into a film, but found the project too risky due to the novel's intricate narrative and complicated plot. Vicente Aranda wrote the script in the summer of 1987 between shooting his films El Lute: Run for Your Life and El Lute II : Tomorrow I'll Be Free. He simplified the story but kept the puzzling structure of the book. The film was made with a budget of 168 million ₧ and 60 million ₧ aid from the Spanish Ministry of Culture. The film was shot in Barcelona.

Victoria Abril was six months pregnant when she shot the brutal sex scene with Jorge Sanz. She later suffered a miscarriage.

Release 
The film screened at the San Sebastián International Film Festival in September 1989 (3rd day). Distributed by United International Pictures, it was theatrically released on 19 September 1989.

Reception
If They Tell You I Fell opened on 19 September 1989 at the San Sebastian Film festival. In Spain it was received coldly by audiences and critics. However Jorge Sanz won Spain's Goya Award as Best Actor for his performance.

The film had a limited release in the United States in New York City. The review in Variety praised the direction, but remarked: "Those with the patience to see this film two or three times, or read the novel by Juan Marsé upon which it is based ahead of time, may understand its convoluted plot. Ordinary film goers will be hard pressed to make any sense out of what they see on the screen."

Ángel Fernández-Santos of El País considered that the film, despite being full of "vigorous images and scenes", featuring "excellently directed excellent performers", and otherwise being "very well edited, beautifully set and lensed", falls apart because of "serious and incomprehensible" mistakes in its writing.

Accolades 

|-
| rowspan = "7" align = "center" | 1990 || rowspan = "7" | 4th Goya Awards || Best Director || Vicente Aranda ||  || rowspan = "7" | 
|-
| Best Adapted Screenplay || Vicente Aranda || 
|-
| Best Actress || Victoria Abril ||  
|-
| Best Actor || Jorge Sanz ||  
|-
| Best Art Direction || Josep Rosell || 
|-
| Best Costume Design || Marcelo Grande || 
|-
| Best Makeup and Hairstyles || Chass Llach, Poli López || 
|}

DVD release
If They Tell You I Fell has been released on DVD in North America twice. It was issued on DVD by Vanguard Cinema in May 2005 as Si te dicen que caí (If They Tell you I Fell), in Spanish with English subtitles. The film was released as Aventis (the film's title in Catalan) by Edi Video in 2006 in Spanish or dubbed English with no subtitles, as the options offered.

See also 
 List of Spanish films of 1989

References

Bibliography
 Cánovás Belchí, Joaquín (ed.), various authors: Miradas sobre el cine de Vicente Aranda, Murcia: Universidad de Murcia, 2000.
 Colmena, Enrique: Vicente Aranda, Cátedra, Madrid, 1986,

External links
 
 
Web Oficial de Vicente Aranda

Spanish drama films
1989 films
1980s Spanish-language films
1989 drama films
Films set in Barcelona
Films directed by Vicente Aranda
Spanish Civil War films
1980s Spanish films
Films about prostitution in Spain
Films based on Spanish novels